Lawrence Joseph Ellison (born August 17, 1944) is an American business magnate and investor who is the co-founder, executive chairman, chief technology officer (CTO) and former chief executive officer (CEO) of the American computer technology company Oracle Corporation. As of February 1, 2023, he was listed by Bloomberg Billionaires Index as the sixth-wealthiest person in the world, with an estimated fortune of $102.6 billion. Ellison is also known for his 98% ownership stake in Lanai, the sixth-largest island in the Hawaiian Archipelago.

Early life and education
Larry Ellison was born in New York City to an unwed Jewish mother. His biological father was an Italian-American United States Army Air Corps pilot. After Ellison contracted pneumonia at the age of nine months, his mother gave him to her aunt and uncle for adoption. He did not meet his biological mother again until he was 48.

Ellison moved to Chicago's South Shore, then a middle-class neighborhood. He remembers his adoptive mother as warm and loving, in contrast to his austere, unsupportive, and often distant adoptive father, who had chosen the name Ellison to honor his point of entry into the United States, Ellis Island. Louis Ellison was a government employee who had made a small fortune in Chicago real estate, only to lose it during the Great Depression.

Although Ellison was raised in a Reform Jewish home by his adoptive parents, who attended synagogue regularly, he remained a religious skeptic. At age thirteen, Ellison refused to have a bar mitzvah celebration. Ellison states: "While I think I am religious in one sense, the particular dogmas of Judaism are not dogmas I subscribe to. I don't believe that they are real. They're interesting stories. They're interesting mythology, and I certainly respect people who believe these are literally true, but I don't. I see no evidence for this stuff." Ellison says that his fondness for Israel is not connected to religious sentiments but rather due to the innovative spirit of Israelis in the technology sector.

Ellison attended South Shore High School in Chicago and later was admitted to University of Illinois at Urbana–Champaign and was enrolled as a premed student. At the university, he was named science student of the year. He withdrew without taking final exams after his sophomore year because his adoptive mother had just died. After spending the summer of 1966 in California, he then attended the University of Chicago for one term, where he studied physics and mathematics and also first encountered computer design. In 1966, at age 22, he moved to Berkeley, California.

Early career and Oracle

While working at Ampex in the early 1970s, he became influenced by Edgar F. Codd's research on relational database design for IBM.  That led in 1977 to the formation of the company which later became Oracle. Oracle became a successful database vendor to mid- and low-range systems, later competing with Sybase (created 1984) and Microsoft SQL Server (a port of Sybase created in 1989) which led to Ellison being listed by Forbes as one of the richest people in the world.

1977–1994 
During the 1970s, after a brief stint at Amdahl Corporation, Ellison began working for Ampex Corporation. His projects included a database for the CIA, which he named "Oracle". Ellison was inspired by a paper written by Edgar F. Codd on relational database systems called "A Relational Model of Data for Large Shared Data Banks". In 1977, he founded Software Development Laboratories (SDL) with two partners and an investment of $2,000; $1,200 of the money was his.

In 1979, the company renamed itself Relational Software Inc.  Ellison had heard about the IBM System R database, also based on Codd's theories, and wanted Oracle to achieve compatibility with it, but IBM made this impossible by refusing to share System R's code. The initial release of the Oracle Database in 1979 was called Oracle version 2; there was no Oracle version 1. In 1983, the company officially became Oracle Systems Corporation after its flagship product.  In 1990, Oracle laid off 10% of its workforce (about 400 people) because it was losing money. This crisis, which almost resulted in the company's bankruptcy, came about because of Oracle's "up-front" marketing strategy, in which sales people urged potential customers to buy the largest possible amount of software all at once. The sales people then booked the value of future license sales in the current quarter, thereby increasing their bonuses. This became a problem when the future sales subsequently failed to materialize. Oracle eventually had to restate its earnings twice, and had to settle class-action lawsuits arising from its having overstated its earnings. Ellison would later say that Oracle had made "an incredible business mistake".

Although IBM dominated the mainframe relational database market with its DB2 and SQL/DS database products, it delayed entering the market for a relational database on Unix and Windows operating systems. This left the door open for Sybase, Oracle, Informix, and eventually Microsoft to dominate mid-range systems and microcomputers. Around this time, Oracle fell behind Sybase. From 1990 to 1993, Sybase was the fastest-growing database company and the database industry's darling vendor, but soon it fell victim to merger mania. Sybase's 1996 merger with Powersoft resulted in a loss of focus on its core database technology. In 1993, Sybase sold the rights to its database software running under the Windows operating system to Microsoft Corporation, which now markets it under the name "SQL Server".

In his early years at Oracle, Ellison was named an Award Recipient in the High Technology Category for the Ernst and Young Entrepreneur of the Year Program.

1994–2010 

In 1994, Informix overtook Sybase and became Oracle's most important rival. The intense war between Informix CEO Phil White and Ellison was front-page Silicon Valley news for three years. In April 1997, Informix announced a major revenue shortfall and earnings restatements. Phil White eventually landed in jail, and IBM absorbed Informix in 2001. Also in 1997, Ellison was made a director of Apple Computer after Steve Jobs returned to the company. Ellison resigned in 2002. With the defeat of Informix and of Sybase, Oracle enjoyed years of industry dominance until the rise of Microsoft SQL Server in the late 1990s and IBM's acquisition of Informix Software in 2001 to complement their DB2 database.  Oracle's main competition for new database licenses on UNIX, Linux, and Windows operating systems comes from IBM's DB2 and from Microsoft SQL Server. IBM's DB2 still dominates the mainframe database market.

In 2005, Oracle Corporation paid Ellison a $975,000 salary, a $6,500,000 bonus, and other compensation of $955,100. In 2007, Ellison earned a total compensation of $61,180,524, which included a base salary of $1,000,000, a cash bonus of $8,369,000, and options granted of $50,087,100. In 2008, he earned a total compensation of $84,598,700, which included a base salary of $1,000,000, a cash bonus of $10,779,000, no stock grants, and options granted of $71,372,700. In the year ending May 31, 2009, he made $56.8 million. In 2006, Forbes ranked him as the richest Californian. In April 2009, after a tug-of-war with IBM and Hewlett-Packard, Oracle announced its intent to buy Sun Microsystems. On July 2, 2009, for the fourth year in a row, Oracle's board awarded Ellison another 7 million stock options. On August 22, 2009, it was reported that Ellison would be paid only $1 for his base salary for the fiscal year of 2010, down from the $1,000,000 he was paid in fiscal 2009.

2010–present 
The European Union approved Oracle's acquisition of Sun Microsystems on January 21, 2010, and agreed that Oracle's acquisition of Sun "has the potential to revitalize important assets and create new and innovative products". The Sun acquisition also gave Oracle control of the popular MySQL open source database, which Sun had acquired in 2008. On August 9, 2010, Ellison denounced Hewlett-Packard's board for firing CEO Mark Hurd, writing that: "The HP board just made the worst personnel decision since the idiots on the Apple board fired Steve Jobs many years ago." (Ellison and Hurd were close personal friends.) Then on September 6, Oracle hired Mark Hurd as co-president alongside Safra Catz. Ellison remained in his current role at Oracle.

In March 2010, the Forbes list of billionaires ranked Ellison as the sixth-richest person in the world and as the third-richest American, with an estimated net worth of US$28 billion. On July 27, 2010, The Wall Street Journal reported that Ellison was the best-paid executive in the last decade, collecting a total compensation of US$1.84 billion. In September 2011, Ellison was listed on the Forbes list of billionaires as the fifth richest man in the world and was still the third richest American, with a net worth of about $36.5 billion. In September 2012, Ellison was again listed on the Forbes list of billionaires as the third richest American citizen, behind Bill Gates and Warren Buffett, with a net worth of $44 billion. In October 2012, he was listed just behind David Hamilton Koch as the eighth richest person in the world, according to the Bloomberg Billionaires Index. Ellison owns stakes in Salesforce.com, NetSuite, Quark Biotechnology Inc. and Astex Pharmaceuticals. In June 2012, Ellison agreed to buy 98 percent of the Hawaiian island of Lana'i from David Murdock's company, Castle & Cooke. The price was reported to be between $500 million and $600 million. In 2005, Ellison agreed to settle a four-year-old insider-trading lawsuit by offering to pay $100 million to charity in Oracle's name.

In 2013, according to The Wall Street Journal, Ellison earned $94.6 million. On September 18, 2014, Ellison appointed Mark Hurd to CEO of Oracle from his former position as president; Safra Catz was also made CEO, moving from her former role as CFO. Ellison assumed the positions of chief technology officer and executive chairman.

In November 2016, Oracle bought NetSuite for $9.3 billion. Ellison owned 35% of NetSuite at the time of the purchase making him $3.5 billion personally.

In 2017, Forbes estimated that Ellison was the 4th richest person in tech.

In June 2018, Ellison's net worth was about $54.5 billion, according to Forbes.

In December 2018, Ellison became a director on the board of Tesla, Inc., after purchasing 3 million shares earlier that year. Ellison left the Tesla Board in August 2022.

As of June 2020, Ellison is said to be the seventh wealthiest person in the world, with a net worth of $66.8 billion.

As of 2022, Ellison owns 42.9 percent of the shares of Oracle Corporation, and 1.5 percent of the shares of Tesla.

Personal life
Ellison has been married and divorced four times:
 Adda Quinn from 1967 to 1974.
 Nancy Wheeler Jenkins from 1977 to 1978. They married six months before Ellison founded Software Development Laboratories. In 1978, the couple divorced. Wheeler gave up any claim on her husband's company for $500.
 Barbara Boothe from 1983 to 1986. Boothe was a former receptionist at Relational Software Inc. (RSI). They had two children, David and Megan, who are film producers at Skydance Media and Annapurna Pictures, respectively.
 Melanie Craft, a romance novelist, from 2003 to 2010. They married on December 18, 2003, at his Woodside estate. Ellison's friend Steve Jobs, former CEO and co-founder of Apple Inc., was the official wedding photographer, and Representative Tom Lantos officiated. They divorced in 2010.

Ellison made a brief cameo appearance in the 2010 movie Iron Man 2. In 2010, Ellison purchased a 50% share of the BNP Paribas Open tennis tournament. Ellison owns many exotic cars, including an Audi R8 and a McLaren F1. His favorite is the Acura NSX, which he was known to give as gifts each year during its production. Ellison is also reportedly the owner of a Lexus LFA.

Yachts
With the economic downturn of  2010, Ellison sold his share of Rising Sun, the 12th largest yacht in the world, making  David Geffen the sole owner. He downsized to Musashi, a  yacht built by Feadship.

Ellison competes in yachting through Oracle Team USA. Following success racing Maxi yachts, Ellison founded BMW Oracle Racing to compete for the 2003 Louis Vuitton Cup.

In 2002, Ellison's Oracle's team introduced kite yachting into the America's Cup environment. Kite sail flying lasting about 30 minutes was achieved during testing in New Zealand.

BMW Oracle Racing was the "Challenger of Record" on behalf of the Golden Gate Yacht Club of San Francisco for the 2007 America's Cup in Valencia, Spain, until eliminated from the 2007 Louis Vuitton Cup challenger-selection series in the semi-finals. On February 14, 2010, Ellison's yacht USA 17 won the second race (in the best of three "deed of gift" series) of the 33rd America's Cup, after winning the first race two days earlier. Securing a historic victory, Ellison and his BMW Oracle team became the first challengers to win a "deed of gift" match. The Cup returned to American shores for the first time since 1995. Ellison served as a crew member in the second race. Previously, Ellison had filed several legal challenges, through the Golden Gate Yacht Club, against the way that Ernesto Bertarelli (also one of the world's richest men) proposed to organize the 33rd America's Cup following the 2007 victory of Bertarelli's team Alinghi. The races were finally held in February 2010 in Valencia.

On September 25, 2013, Ellison's Oracle Team USA defeated Emirates Team New Zealand to win the 34th America's Cup in San Francisco Bay, California. Oracle Team USA had been penalized two points in the final for cheating by some team members during the America's Cup World Series warm-up events. The Oracle team came from a 1–8 deficit to win 9–8, in what has been called "one of the greatest comebacks in sports history".

Oracle Racing lost the 2017 America's Cup to Team New Zealand.

In 2019, Ellison, in conjunction with Russell Coutts, started the SailGP international racing series. The series used F50 foiling catamarans, the fastest class of boat in history with regattas held across the globe. Ellison committed to five years of funding to support the series until it could become self sustaining. The first season was successful with global audiences of over 1.8 billion.

Aviation
Ellison is a licensed pilot who has owned several aircraft. He was cited by the city of San Jose, California, for violating its limits on late-night takeoffs and landings from San Jose Mineta International Airport by planes weighing more than 75,000 pounds (34,019 kg). In January 2000, Ellison sued over the interpretation of the airport rule, contending that his Gulfstream V aircraft "is certified by the manufacturer to fly at two weights: 75,000 pounds, and at 90,000 pounds for heavier loads or long flights requiring more fuel. But the pilot only lands the plane in San Jose when it weighs 75,000 pounds or less, and has the logs to prove it." US District Judge Jeremy Fogel ruled in Ellison's favor in June 2001, calling for a waiver for Ellison's jet, but did not invalidate the curfew.

Ellison also owns at least two military jets: the Italian training aircraft SIAI-Marchetti S.211, and a decommissioned Soviet fighter MiG-29, which the US government has refused him permission to import.

Tennis
In 2009, Ellison purchased the Indian Wells Tennis Garden tennis facility in California's Coachella Valley and the Indian Wells Masters tournament for $100 million, and has subsequently invested another $100 million into the club.

Homes
Ellison styled his estimated $110 million Woodside, California, estate after feudal Japanese architecture, complete with a man-made  lake and an extensive seismic retrofit. In 2004 and 2005 he purchased more than 12 properties in Malibu, California, worth more than $180 million. The $65 million Ellison spent on five contiguous lots at Malibu's Carbon Beach made this the most costly residential transaction in United States history until banker Ronald Perelman sold his Palm Beach, Florida, compound for $70 million later that same year. His entertainment system at his Pacific Heights home cost $1 million, and includes a rock concert-sized video projector at one end of a drained swimming pool, using the gaping hole as a giant subwoofer.

In early 2010, Ellison purchased the Astors' Beechwood Mansion – formerly the summer home of the Astor family – in Newport, Rhode Island, for $10.5 million.

In 2011 he purchased the 249-acre Porcupine Creek Estate and private golf course in Rancho Mirage, California, for $42.9 million. The property was formerly the home of Yellowstone Club founders Edra and Tim Blixseth, and was sold to Ellison by creditors following their divorce and bankruptcy.

On June 21, 2012, the governor of Hawaii, Neil Abercrombie, declared that Ellison had signed an agreement to buy most of the island of Lanai from the Castle & Cooke company, owned by David H. Murdock. Following the purchase Ellison owns 98% of Lanai, Hawaii's sixth-largest island.

In December 2020, he left California and moved to Lanai.

In 2022, Ellison bought a 22-acre property in Manalapan, Florida for $173 million. He purchased it from Jim Clark, who in turn had acquired it from the Ziff family. It is the most expensive residential property purchase in Florida history.

Philanthropy
In 1992 Ellison shattered his elbow in a high-speed bicycle crash. After receiving treatment at University of California, Davis, Ellison donated $5 million to seed the Lawrence J. Ellison Musculo-Skeletal Research Center. In 1998, the Lawrence J. Ellison Ambulatory Care Center opened on the Sacramento campus of the UC Davis Medical Center.

To settle an insider trading lawsuit arising from his selling nearly $1 billion of Oracle stock, a court allowed Ellison to donate $100 million to his own charitable foundation without admitting wrongdoing. A California judge refused to allow Oracle to pay Ellison's legal fees of $24 million. Ellison's lawyer had argued that if Ellison were to pay the fees, that could be construed as an admission of guilt. His charitable donations to Stanford University raised questions about the independence of two Stanford professors who evaluated the case's merits for Oracle. In response to the September 11 terrorist attacks of 2001, Ellison made a controversial offer to donate software to the federal government that would have enabled it to build and run a national identification database and to issue ID cards.

Forbes 2004 list of charitable donations made by the wealthiest 400 Americans stated that Ellison had donated $151,092,103, about 1% of his estimated personal wealth. In June 2006, Ellison announced he would not honor his earlier pledge of $115 million to Harvard University, claiming it was due to the departure of former president Lawrence Summers. Oracle spokesman Bob Wynne announced, "It was really Larry Summers' brainchild and once it looked like Larry Summers was leaving, Larry Ellison reconsidered ... [I]t was Larry Ellison and Larry Summers that had initially come up with this notion." In 2007 Ellison pledged $500,000 to fortify a community centre in Sderot, Israel, after discovering that the building was not fortified against rocket attacks. Other charitable donations by Ellison include a $10 million donation to the Friends of the Israel Defense Forces in 2014. In 2017 Ellison again donated to the Friends of the Israel Defense Forces, this time for $16.6 million. His donation was intended to support the construction of well-being facilities on a new campus for co-ed conscripts.

In August 2010 a report listed Ellison as one of the 40 billionaires who had signed "The Giving Pledge".

In May 2016 Ellison donated $200 million to the University of Southern California for establishing a cancer research center: the Lawrence J. Ellison Institute for Transformative Medicine of USC.

Political involvement

Ellison was critical of NSA whistle-blower Edward Snowden, saying that "Snowden had yet to identify a single person who had been 'wrongly injured' by the NSA's data collection". He has donated to both Democratic and Republican politicians, and in late 2014 hosted Republican senator Rand Paul at a fundraiser at his home.

Ellison was one of the top donors to Conservative Solutions PAC, a super PAC supporting Marco Rubio's 2016 presidential bid. As of February 2016, Ellison had given $4 million overall to the PAC. In 2020, Ellison allowed former president Donald Trump to have a fundraiser at his Rancho Mirage estate, but Ellison was not present.  In January 2022, Ellison donated $15 million to the Opportunity Matters Fund super PAC associated with Sen. Tim Scott (R-SC), which is one of the most significant financial contributions of the 2022 election cycle.

The Washington Post reported in May 2022 that Ellison participated in a conference call days after the 2020 presidential election that focused on strategies for challenging the legitimacy of the vote. Other participants on the call included Fox News host Sean Hannity, senator Lindsey Graham, Trump personal attorney Jay Sekulow and James Bopp, an attorney for True the Vote. The Post cited court documents and a participant on the call.

Recognition
In 1997, Ellison received the Golden Plate Award of the American Academy of Achievement.

In 2013, Ellison was inducted into the Bay Area Business Hall of Fame.

In 2019, the Lawrence J. Ellison Institute for Transformative Medicine of USC honored Ellison with the first Rebels With A Cause Award in recognition of his generous support through the years.

See also
 Ellison Medical Foundation

References

Further reading
 Leibovich, Mark. The New Imperialists (Prentice Hall, 2002) pp 11–54. online

External links

 Profile at Oracle Corporation
 Profile at Forbes
 Profile at Bloomberg L.P.
 Biography at BBC News
 
 
 
 
 
 

 
1944 births
University of Illinois Urbana-Champaign alumni
University of Chicago alumni
2007 America's Cup sailors
2010 America's Cup sailors
America's Cup
American adoptees
American aviators
American billionaires
American computer businesspeople
American male sailors (sport)
Jewish sailors (sport)
American Ashkenazi Jews
20th-century American Jews
American people of Italian descent
American people of Russian-Jewish descent
American technology chief executives
American technology company founders
Businesspeople from California
Businesspeople from New York City
Businesspeople in software
Directors of Apple Inc.
Giving Pledgers
21st-century philanthropists
Jewish American philanthropists
California Republicans
Life extensionists
Living people
Oracle Corporation
Oracle employees
Oracle Racing sailors
People from Rancho Mirage, California
People from the Bronx
People from Woodside, California
Philanthropists from New York (state)
SailGP
Tesla, Inc.
21st-century American Jews
Centibillionaires